Churchville is a census-designated place (CDP) in the western part of Augusta County, Virginia, United States. The population as of the 2010 Census was 194. Churchville is part of the Staunton–Waynesboro Micropolitan Statistical Area.

An 1855 gazetteer described the village as a stagecoach stop that contained "2 churches, 2 stores, and 2 schools." Churchville was a famous town during the time of the Civil War. W. Taylor Reveley III, 27th President of the College of William and Mary was born in Churchville.

Churchville is a tree-lined community that is home to several churches (currently 4), the Churchville Public Library, part of the Augusta County Library Branch, and Churchville Elementary School (Grades K-5). Several businesses are located there, including Family Dollar, Riverside Grocery, First and Citizens Bank, Village Pizza Too!, Tastee-Freeze, medical practice, Dentist, Law Office and Wool Mill.

Hanger Mill was listed on the National Register of Historic Places in 1991.

References

Census-designated places in Augusta County, Virginia